Hongzhou or Hong Prefecture was a zhou (prefecture) in modern Jiangxi, China, seated in modern Nanchang. It existed (intermittently) from 589 to 1165.

Geography
The administrative region of Hongzhou in the Tang dynasty falls within modern Jiangxi. It probably includes parts of modern: 
 Under the administration of Nanchang:
 Nanchang: Donghu District, Xihu District, Qingyunpu District, Wanli District and Qingshanhu District
 Nanchang County
 Anyi County
 Xinjian County
 Jinxian County
 Under the administration of Jiujiang:
 Yongxiu County
 Wuning County
 Xiushui County
 Under the administration of Yichun:
 Tonggu County
 Wanzai County
 Shanggao County
 Yifeng County
 Fengxin County
 Jing'an County
 Gao'an
 Fengcheng

References
 

Prefectures of the Sui dynasty
Prefectures of the Tang dynasty
Prefectures of the Song dynasty
Prefectures of Southern Tang
Prefectures of Yang Wu
Nanchang
Former prefectures in Jiangxi